Equitable Building of Hollywood, also known as the Bank of Hollywood Building, was the second high-rise office building built at the intersection of Hollywood and Vine in Hollywood, California. It is rendered in a late Gothic Revival and Art Deco style and is Los Angeles Historic-Cultural Monument #1088. It is also a contributor to the Hollywood Boulevard Commercial and Entertainment District on the National Register of Historic Places.

History
The Equitable Building was envisioned as part of The Five-Finger Plan, an infrastructure plan that made use of both public and private funds to "metropolitanize" Hollywood as an urban core. It was designed by architect Alex Curlett and built in two phases. The first phase was undertaken in 1929, which created  of office space above the ground floor, which housed retail businesses and the Bank of Hollywood. The second phase of construction took place in 1931, at which point Myron Selznick, brother of David O. Selznick, moved his agency into the building. Kenneth P. Butler's Butler Health Institute also began a lease around this time, occupying the entire roof and twelfth story with "tiled steam rooms, showers, private toilet facilities, separate treatment rooms, [and] exercising rooms." The headquarters of Marian Nixon's Beauty Arts Institute also occupied space in the building. In April 1931, the Jassby Drug Company entered a long-term lease for space on the building's ground floor.

The first floor at one time housed Bernard Luggage, Oshkosh Luggage, and other businesses. From the 1950s through the 1970s, storefronts and interior public spaces were modernized, including a front entrance redesign, while between 1999 and 2001, exterior and main lobby alterations were remediated and original features were reconstructed.

As of 2004, the building's upper stories have been converted to residential use, with 60 units' worth of condos designed by Kenneth Brown and Pamela Shamshiri. Circa 2011, the architectural M2A held office space in the lower retail space.

References

Los Angeles Historic-Cultural Monuments
Residential skyscrapers in Los Angeles
Buildings and structures in Hollywood, Los Angeles
1929 establishments in California
1931 establishments in California
1920s architecture in the United States
Office buildings completed in 1929
Office buildings completed in 1931
1930s architecture in the United States
Art Deco architecture in California
Gothic Revival architecture in California
Residential condominiums in the United States